Scopula julietae is a moth of the family Geometridae. It is endemic to Fiji.

References

Endemic fauna of Fiji
Moths described in 1975
julietae
Moths of Fiji